SplatSpace is a multidisciplinary collaborative workspace located in Durham, North Carolina. SplatSpace, also known as SplatSpace: Durham's HackerSpace, and previously as Durham's MakerSpace is a 501(c)(3) non-profit organization composed primarily of people from the local maker community. Classifiable as a Hackerspace or Makerspace, the majority of activities members are involved in typically revolve around technology, however, traditional skills such as wood-working, metal working, textiles, arts and crafts are represented as well.

Origins 
Splatspace was initially founded in 2010 as Durham's MakerSpace by Alan Dipert.

Mission statement 
"To provide a space for its members and the local community to develop and share their interests in science, technology, art, and culture."

Organizational structure 
SplatSpace's primary organizational unit is its board of directors, which consists of a president, vice president, treasurer, secretary, public relations officer, and two at large board members. Officer positions are occupied by elected members on a yearly cycle; all board positions are volunteer positions. Despite having a board of directors, SplatSpace is largely a do-ocracy wherein members themselves drive activities either independently or in conjunction with the board.

Membership driven funding model 
SplatSpace is a primarily membership driven organization, and operational funds are obtained through the collection of monthly recurring membership fees. Income and expenses are public record, and available in the  monthly meeting's minutes which are published on the first Tuesday of each month.

Logo and nomenclature 
The name is derived from the asterisk, a symbol which when used in regular expressions is used to match any number of characters. An asterisk, which is sometimes referred to as a "splat" has historic etymological roots in the fields of programming and computer science. This naming convention is meant to symbolically represent the diversity of skills and interests represented by the membership base and local maker community.

Community activities 
SplatSpace is host to, and has organized various community activities.

In 2012 Splat Space partnered with the Efland-Cheeks Elementary School to sponsor a "Robot Mini-Camp" using Lego Mindstorms.

Recurring events 
Weekly meetings are held weekly on Tuesday nights, and are free and open to the public. Additional recurring events include a monthly "Game Night", "Splaturday! Open Project Afternoon", and "Software Sundays" ; The main schedule of events is located on the organization's MeetUp page.

References 

Organizations based in Durham, North Carolina
Collaborative projects
Business incubators of the United States
Organizations established in 2010
2010 establishments in North Carolina